The 2011 Wafu Club Championship (sometimes referred to as the Eyadema Unity Cup) is an association football competition that will be contested between club sides in the WAFU/UFOA region.

Teams

GAMTEL FC
Aduana Stars
Athlético de Coléah
Horoya AC
Mighty Barrolle
Watanga FC
Akokana FC
Dan Kassawa FC
Kwara United
Enugu Rangers
ASC Niarry-Tally
ASC HLM

First round
First leg games played June 19–21 (Kwara vs Aduana postponed to July 8)

|}

Second round

|}

Third round
First Leg played on August 20–21. Second Leg played September 10–11

|}

Repechage
Horoya AC advances over Akokana FC by walkover.

Semifinals

Third Place

Final

References

2011
2011 in African football